Jacob Gregory is an Indian-American actor who has appeared in Malayalam films. He made his film debut with ABCD (2013) directed by Martin Prakkat. He got a breakthrough role in the TV series Akkara Kazhchakal, where he portrayed the character Gregory also known as "Giri giri". Gregory has lived in New Jersey since 1990.

Career 
Before his debut into the film industry, He was doing a character role in the hit sitcom Akkara Kazhchakal. His character was well received by the family audience along with the sitcom. He was able to tour across the United States, Canada, and the European Union; performing shows on a variety of stages based on Akkara Kazhchakal. A mutual friend suggested Gregory's name to Prakkat when the director was looking for someone to play the lead along with Dulquer Salmaan for the movie ABCD as Korah.

Filmography

References

External links
 
 facebook homepage

Male actors from Kerala
Living people
Male actors in Malayalam cinema
Indian male film actors
21st-century Indian male actors
1986 births